The military tactics of Alexander the Great (356 BC - 323 BC) show that he was one of the greatest generals in history. During the Battle of Chaeronea (338 BC), won against the Athenian and Theban armies, and the battles of Granicius (334 BC) and of Issos (333 BC), won against the Achaemenid Persian army of Darius III, Alexander employed the so-called "hammer and anvil" tactic. However, in the battle of Gaugamela (331 BC), the Persians possessed an army vastly superior in numbers to the Macedonian army. This tactic of encirclement by rapid shock units was not very feasible. Alexander had to compose and decide on an innovative combat formation for the time; he arranged his units in levels; he pretended to want to encircle the enemy in order to better divide it and thus opened a breach in its defensive lines.

Troop composition and weapons 
The origin of a line infantry with a hoplitic formation has to be traced back to the reign of Archelaus.

Before him, the only heavy infantry available to the Kingdom of Macedonia was supplied by the allied Greek cities.

However its true creator was Philip II, considered the inventor of the Macedonian phalanx: a particularly effective heavy infantry, freed of a part of its defensive armament—the shield was reduced by a third, the cuirass abandoned—in favor of a longer pike, the sarissa, and of an increased loading speed.

The length of the sarissa allowed to increase the number of file of hoplites that could fight. The sarissa consisted of a point at each extremity and was heavy. At its base, a short iron point allowed it to be planted in the ground to stop the charge of enemy soldiers. This strategy was particularly effective in breaking the cavalry charges or the opposing phalanxs. But the Macedonian phalanx was also fearsome in offensive use. The principle was to accumulate the maximum kinetic energy so that the impact of the lances would be as devastating as possible. To this end, the hoplites charged in compact group of 16 files so tightly packed that their masses were built up. The lightening of the equipment increased the speed of the phalanx.

The Macedonian phalanxes were from then on much more powerful than their classical counterparts and the impact was likely to bring down many ranks of enemy infantrymen. To increase this effect the sarissas were raised to the vertical during the charge—they formed a very tight net that stopped the projectiles—and set horizontal at the last moment, the pole impelled forward the shoulder of the infantryman creating a shock wave that propagated to the front rank and released a destructive impact on the enemy infantry, accumulating the energy of the driven mass of the hoplites with that of the lowering of the sarissas. Outside the tight formation of the phalanx, the sarissa caused discomfort during marches and therefore, it was divided into two parts that were united before the battle.

Another advantage of this armament was that it was less expensive, thus allowing to equip a large number of soldiers. This military reform also had considerable political consequences, since it made it possible to integrate a considerably larger number of Macedonians in the defense of the kingdom and in its political life. At the end of Philip's reign, the number of Macedonians mobilizable in heavy infantry recruited on a territorial basis was estimated at 30,000.

Philip's army consisted of a core of professional infantrymen, the pezhetairoi (fellow footmen)—who constituted the royal guard—and a territorial levy.

Alexander's army consisted of 24,000 infantrymen divided into 12 taxeis of phalangites of about 1,500 men and three quiliarchies of 1000 hypaspists. It is necessary to add an undetermined number of archers and other light phalangites. Alexander extended the denomination of pezhetairoi to the group of phalangites, which explains the loyalty that the latter showed to him, and after his death, to his direct descendants.

The second masterpiece of the Macedonian army was the heavy cavalry recruited among the Macedonian nobility, called the Companion Cavalry (hetairoi). It consisted of 3,000 heavy, shock-capable cavalry,  at the beginning of Alexander's campaigns, of which 1,800 accompanied him in Asia. It was divided into 12 squadrons, the first being the Royal Squadron (basilikè ilè), also called the  άγεμα, agêma, 'that which leads'. This squadron was 300 strong, while the other squadrons consisted of 250 lancers. 
 
The basic cavalry unit was an  ilē, a squadron of 250 Companions commanded by an ilarch, and was divided into two lochoi, in turn divided into two tetrarchies of 60 cavalrymen, commanded by a tetrarch. Between 330 BC and 328 BC, the Companions were reformed into regiments (hipparchies) of 2-3 squadrons. In conjunction with this, each squadron was divided into two lochoi. 

The tactical formation of the Companions was the wedge, adopted by Philip II from the Scythians. The squadron commander was at the point of this triangular formation. The formation was very manoeuvrable, with the squadron following its leader at the apex, "like a flight of cranes".

Each Companion had a servant in charge of looking after his horse and equipment. The cavalrymen owned their mount, and when they enlisted they received the money needed to buy a quality one.

The Companion cavalry wore helmets, at first of the Phrygian type, painted with the colors of the squadron, until Alexander imposed the simpler boeotian model. The helmets of officers were decorated with painted or metallic laurel wreaths, which indicated their rank. They wore a cuirass and boots, but no shield. They were armed with a long spear (xyston) made of cornelian wood, provided with a point at either end, so that it could be used if it broke. As a secondary weapon, the Companion carried on the left side a  sword (kopis, makhaira or xyston). 

The tactical use of this cavalry was based on the Achilles heel of the phalanxes. Their vulnerability in the flanks and rearguard—it was practically impossible to pivot to stop a flank and rearguard attack due to the hindrance of the sarissas. The destructive effect of the phalanx was due to the cohesion of the hoplites during the impact, a cavalry attack from the flanks or from the rearguard was likely to disorganize the formation and make it vulnerable during the impact against another phalanx. It was the combination of phalanx and cavalry in the tactics of the hammer and the anvil that provided the decisive tactical advantage to the armies of Alexander the Great and that was the basis of the conquest of his immense empire.

Alexander, in his journey to the Indus, integrated into his army that of the defeated countries and was inspired by them to modify the equipment of his own forces.

Hammer and anvil tactics

Principle 
This tactic could not be carried out unless the two armies had more or less the same number of troops, since it consisted of enclosing the opponent on the sides.

 The "anvil" corresponded to the phalanx and the hypaspists (the elite infantry) that pressed the adversary and contained it in an enclosed space.

 The "hammer" corresponded to the heavy cavalry of the hetairoi that intervened right after.

Phase 1: "The hammer" 
In order to drive the enemy forces away from their center, the Macedonian cavalry surrounded the flanks of the opposing army, systematically on the right flank which was commanded by Alexander himself, and then tried to make a gap and position themselves in the enemy lines, thus forcing their enemies to regroup.

Phase 2: "The anvil" 
Attacking from the flanks, the Macedonian cavalry surprised the enemy troops by the speed and force of its impact; in the center, the phalanx and the hypaspists advanced to open the second front. Once the enemy's way was closed, it was left in a trap. Generally, this caused great confusion because it could not be distinguished whether the units were dispersed or just poorly coordinated.

Battle of Gaugamela tactics 

The Battle of Gaugamela was the decisive confrontation between Alexander's army and that of Darius III (October 1, 331 BC). It is also known as the Battle of Arbela, due to its relative proximity to the city of Arbela, today's Erbil, in northern Iraq.

Number of troops 
Alexander the Great had an army of 47,000 men, which was small compared to those of Darius—who according to modern historians assembled between 100,000 and 240,000 soldiers, maximum figure due to supply problems. The "hammer" and "anvil" tactics, which were the key to Alexander's victories until then, could no longer lead to victory, for it was indeed impossible to surround the entire Persian army.

Battle development

Levels disposition 
In order not to be surrounded by the innumerable Persian cavalry, Alexander decided to arrange his troops in levels, something completely innovative at the time. Alexander took command of the right wing of the companion cavalry (hetairoi), while Darius III remained in the center, in the middle of his troops. To cover as much ground as possible, Alexander decided to lengthen his right flank. He advanced at a trot to be closely followed by his battalions of elite sharpshooters (foot soldiers equipped with slings or short-range spears), which Alexander had as support troops. This tactic served to make the Persian army unaware of his presence. The phalangists and the cavalry of Thessaly and Thrace, placed on the left wing under the command of Parmenion, had to hold their position for as long as possible.

Maximum ground coverage 
Alexander's plan worked: troops A, B, and C (letters arbitrarily assigned to allow for quick definition) blocked their way, thus creating a gap in the Persian army. Making a quick about-face, Alexander turned around to head for the gap. The slingers and lancers, hitherto covered by the right wing of the cavalry, were uncovered and carried out their mission. On the other fronts, the cavalry of the left wing and Alexander's infantry nevertheless resisted the onslaught of the Persian chariots on the Macedonian center.

Darius retreat 
The slingers and lancers attacked troops A, B and C to prevent them from performing their maneuvers. As these troops were destabilized, they lost formation. Alexander stepped into the breach and decided to go after Darius III, riding in his chariot and protected by the Royal Guard. When Darius saw what Alexander intended to do, he realized that he had no choice but to flee. His flight demoralized the troops. On the other fronts, the left wing and the phalanx began to show signs of weakness, since the troops attacking them did not hear the signal to retreat because they were in the midst of the heat of battle and far from the Persian king.

Darius persecution and death 
As happened during the battle of Issus, Alexander almost captured Darius, but the cavalry of the left wing was very weakened. Alexander then decided to let Darius go in order to save his army. Taking advantage of the situation in which the Macedonians found themselves, the Persian troops fled the battlefield with their leaders. Alexander was assured of victory, even though at the beginning of the battle his position was not favorable, but he was disappointed that he had not been able to capture or kill the Great King.

Darius fled with his guard of Immortals and the Bactriana cavalry. Seeing that Alexander was determined to capture Darius, a group of nobles, including the Bessi, Barsaentes and Nabarzanes satraps, took the Persian King hostage, so that they could make a pact with Alexander. However, they decided to assassinate and abandon him shortly before his arrival for fear that Alexander would not accept such a negotiation. Following this victory, Alexander was crowned as King of Asia in a lavish ceremony held in Arbela and upon his arrival in Babylon.

See also 

 Alexander the Great

 Ancient Macedonian army

 Chronology of European exploration of Asia

References

Bibliography 

 Antonis y Pavlo Georgakis, Arbèles, Socomer, coll. «Les grandes batailles de l'histoire», 1989.

 Sekunda, N. y Warry, J., Alexander the Great: His Armies and Campaigns 334-323 BC, London, 1998.

 Sekunda, N., The army of Alexander the Great, London, 1984.

 Sekunda, N., The Persian army 560-330 BC, London, 1992.

 Ashley, J. R., The Macedonian empire. The era of warfare under Philip II and Alexander the Great 359-323BC, London, 1998.

 Brunt, P. A., «Alexander's Macedonian cavalry» en JHS 83, 1963.

 Burn, A. R., The generalship of Alexander the Great en Greece and Rome 12, 1965.

 Cassin-Scott, J., The Greek and Persian wars 500-323 BC, London, 1977.

 Devine, A. M., «Grand tactics at Gaugamela» en Phoenix 29, 1975.

 Ellis, J. R., «Alexander's hypaspists again» en Historia 24, 1975.

 Engels, D. W., Alexander the Great and the logistics of the Macedonian army, Berkeley, 1978.

 Engels, D., Alexander's intelligence system en CQ 30, 1980.

 Fuller, J. F. C., The generalship of Alexander the Great, London, 1958.

 Griffith, G. T., «Alexander's generalship at Gaugamela» en JHS 67, 1947.

 Griffith,G. T., «A note on the hipparchies of Alexander» en JHS 83, 1963.

 Hamilton, J. R., «The cavalry battle at the Hydaspes» en JHS 76, 1956.

 Hammond, N. G. L., «The battle of the Granicus river» en JHS 100, 1980.

 Hammond, N. G. L., «The various guards of Philip II and Alexander III» en: Historia 40, 1991.

 Hammond, N. G. L., «Alexander's charge at the battle of Issus in 333 BC» en Historia 41, 1992.

 Hanson, V.D. (ed.), Hoplites: the classical Greek battle experience, London, 1991.

 Hanson, V. D., «Genesis of the infantry 600-350BC» en G. Parker (ed.), The Cambridge illustrated history of warfare. The triumph of the West, Cambridge, 1995.

 Head, D., The Achaemenid Persian army, Stockworth, 1992.

 Heckel, W., The somatophylakes of Alexander the Great: some notes en Historia 27, 1978.

 Lock, R.A., The origins of the argyraspids en Historia 26, 1977.

 Markle III, M.M., The Macedonian sarissa, spear and related armor en AJA 81, 1977.

 Markle III, M.M., Use of the sarissa by Philip and Alexander of Macedon en AJA 82, 1978.

 Markle III, M.M., Macedonian arms and tactics under Alexander the Great en B. Barr-Sharrar (ed.), Macedonia and Greece in late classical and early Hellenistic times, Washington, 1982.

 Marsden, E.W., The campaign of Gaugamela, Liverpool, 1964.

 Milns, R.D., Alexander's Macedonian cavalry and Diodorus XVII 17.4 en JHS 86

 Milns, R.D., Alexander's seventh phalanx battalion en GRBS 7, 1966.

 Milns, R.D., Alexander's seventh phalanx battalion en GRBS 7, 1966.

 Milns, R.D., The hypaspists of Alexander III - some problems en Historia 20, 1971.

 Milns, R.D., The army of Alexander the Great en Fondations Hardt 22, 1976.

 Neumann, C., A note on Alexander's march-rates en Historia 20, 1971.

 Parke, H.W., Greek mercenary soldiers from the earliest times to the battle of Ipsus , Chicago, 1981.

 Warry, J., Alexander 334-323 BC: conquest of the Persian empire, London, 1991.

 Worley, L.J., Hippeis. The cavalry of Ancient Greece Oxford, 1994.

Alexander the Great
Military tactics
Military history of ancient Greece